Music Is Better Than Words is the debut studio album by American actor and singer Seth MacFarlane. The album was produced and conducted by film and television composer Joel McNeely, who is also one of the composers of American Dad!, an animated TV series co-created by MacFarlane. On November 30, 2011, the album received nominations at the 54th Grammy Awards for Best Traditional Pop Vocal Album and Best Engineered Album, Non-Classical.

MacFarlane's musical background
MacFarlane has performed at London's Royal Albert Hall and New York's Carnegie Hall. He received voice training from Lee and Sally Sweetland, both of whom have worked with Frank Sinatra and Barbra Streisand. MacFarlane is also a pianist and utilizes an orchestra and composers on a weekly basis to score his two current animated series, Family Guy and American Dad!.

Conception and production
The album includes songs from Rodgers and Hammerstein and Lerner and Loewe, among others from the 1940s, 1950s and 1960s. The track listing was chosen by MacFarlane.

When Universal Republic Records asked MacFarlane what kind of album he wanted to do, he said "a classic Sinatra-style album".  The album was, in fact, recorded at Capitol Records in the same room in which Sinatra had worked. Moreover, MacFarlane recorded the vocals for Music Is Better Than Words with the microphone that Sinatra used on many of his classic albums.

In an interview with Joseph Llanes from AOL he said, "That mic is over 60 years old and you can see it. But it has a really nice, dark sound to it. It really plays a significant part on how this stuff sounds. You don't want it to sound too crisp. We did a lot in the recording of this album to make sure it was not too perfect. We recorded to analog tape as opposed to recording digitally because we wanted a little bit of a hiss."

Announcement
On the February 10, 2011 episode of the TBS variety nighttime talk-show series Conan,  MacFarlane announced that he was working on his debut album. During this show, he performed the song "The Sadder But Wiser Girl".

On another guest appearance on The Tonight Show with Jay Leno, he announced he was working with Universal Republic Records in putting together a big band album after signing a record deal. MacFarlane explained, "It's rare in this day and age to have the opportunity to create an album that celebrates the classic, sophisticated sound of rich, lush swing orchestrations. It will be an absolute joy to sing this music, and I look forward to working with the entire team at Universal Republic on what we intend to make an exceptional project." He also performed the song "You're the Cream in My Coffee" during this appearance.

Critical reception

The album received mixed reviews. Slant Magazine described it as "a novelty record" and wrote, "Collaborating with Joel McNeely on arrangements, MacFarlane casts Music Is Better Than Words as a tribute to the big-band swing and sterling pop of the Rat Pack, but he wisely avoids choosing songs that were recorded by his musical idols. There's a timelessness to the melodies of James Van Heusen's "It's Anybody's Spring" and Rodgers and Hammerstein's "Something Good," and McNeely's tasteful horn and string arrangements are flawless recreations of the sounds of Sinatra's mid-century records."  The review continued with "...the album has nothing to offer beyond MacFarlane's attempts to preserve and honor this particular style of music" and concluded, "Music Is Better Than Words doesn't have any greater purpose than to allow MacFarlane the opportunity to indulge in his desire to record an album of standards."

Spin expressed a dissenting opinion, calling the album "alternately audacious and befuddling... devotees will search in vain for the necrophilia punch lines, while Sinatra fans will search in vain for a plausible explanation." AllMusic wrote: "MacFarlane and McNeely don't attempt to ape the pizzazz of Frank [Sinatra]'s Reprise years, nor do they spend much time with May's snazzy snap, they stick with Riddle and Jenkins, keeping things sentimental and lush even when the words crackle with wit. Then again, MacFarlane is so concerned about inhabiting Sinatra's silken suits he doesn't really care about the meaning of the songs; all that matters is sounding like Ol' Blue Eyes, which MacFarlane does about as well as any number of hotel lounge singers this world over."

Track listing

Chart positions

References

External links

2011 debut albums
Big band albums
Jazz albums by American artists
Seth MacFarlane albums
Swing albums
Universal Republic Records albums
Albums produced by Joel McNeely
Covers albums